Henriette Jørgensen (1791–1847) was a Danish stage actress and translator.

Daughter of the book-keeper Gert Diderich J. and Henriette Rose. She was active as an amateur actress in Borups Selskab before she debuted at the Royal Danish Theatre in 1816. She was regarded as much talented but not beautiful, and she played the part of mother in tragedies, comedies, vaudeville and in realistic drama. She retired in 1845.

She also translated French comedies, such as Rodolphe by Eugene Scribe and Mélesville to Broder og Søster (1834).

References 
 http://www.kvinfo.dk/side/597/bio/1030/origin/170/

1791 births
1847 deaths
Danish stage actresses
19th-century Danish actresses
19th-century translators
19th-century Danish women writers
19th-century Danish writers